Poecilothrissa centralis, the Central Zaire pellonuline, is a very small fish of the herring family which is found only in Lake Tumba and the Ruki River as well as the Congo and Busira Rivers.  It is the only member of its genus.

References

Clupeidae
Taxa named by Max Poll
Fish of Africa
Fish described in 1974